Ryan Francis Higgins (born 6 January 1995) is a professional cricketer who plays for Middlesex, on loan from Gloucestershire. He is a right-handed batter who bowls right arm medium pace.

Born in Harare, Zimbabwe, he attended Ruzawi School, before moving to the UK, where he began his career with Middlesex, making his professional debut in the 2014 NatWest t20 Blast against Somerset in 2014. His first-class debut came against Yorkshire three years later, and at the end of the 2017 season, he signed for Gloucestershire on a three-year contract. In September 2019, Higgins was shortlisted for the Professional Cricketers Association, Players Player of the Year award.

In April 2022, he was drafted by the Welsh Fire for the 2022 season of The Hundred.

References

External links
 

1995 births
Living people
English cricketers
Gloucestershire cricketers
Middlesex cricketers
Zimbabwean emigrants to the United Kingdom
Welsh Fire cricketers